Garston railway station was a railway station in the Garston district of Liverpool, England. The station was located on the Northern Line of the Merseyrail suburban rail network. The station was closed in 2006 when it was replaced by Liverpool South Parkway, which is a combined bus and rail interchange. The proximity of the stations was so close the platforms of South Parkway nearly merged onto the Garston station's platforms.

History

The station was opened on 1 April 1874 by the Cheshire Lines Committee. It was served by local services between Liverpool Central, Warrington and Manchester, and also to Aintree Central on the North Liverpool Extension Line.

In 1960, the passenger service to Aintree was cut back to Gateacre. In 1966 services from Manchester were diverted to Liverpool Lime Street, leaving Garston with just the Gateacre-Liverpool train. This service continued until 17 April 1972, when Garston station closed along with the line from Liverpool Central.

In 1978, the former CLC route through Garston was partially reinstated as part of the electrified Northern Line of Merseyrail, and the station reopened on 2 January 1978 as a single platform terminus for services from Kirkby. Prior to the 1972 closure, the station had been named simply Garston, but upon reopening in 1978, it became Garston (Lancs), which was changed in 1979 to Garston (Merseyside). In 1983 services were extended further south to Hunts Cross and Garston once again became a through station with two platforms. In 1984 services were diverted to run to Southport instead of Kirkby. From the airports opening in 1933 until 1986 it was the nearest station to Liverpool Airport.

In 2004, work began on a combined rail-bus interchange at Liverpool South Parkway. The new station's proximity to Garston rendered the old station surplus to requirements.  Garston closed on 10 June 2006 and Liverpool South Parkway opened the following day.

The station was demolished soon after closure, but the access road with its original road markings still exist. As of the 5th of July 2022, there is a temporary construction crew at the station.

Services
At the time of closure, trains operated to Southport via Liverpool Central to the north, and Hunts Cross to the south at 15-minute intervals, Monday-Saturday daytimes.  During evenings and all day Sundays, the frequency was every 30 minutes.

See also
Allerton TMD
Allerton Junction
Garston Dock railway station
Hunts Cross chord

References

External links
Disused Stations Site Record

Disused railway stations in Liverpool
Former Cheshire Lines Committee stations
Railway stations in Great Britain opened in 1874
Railway stations in Great Britain closed in 1972
Railway stations in Great Britain opened in 1978
Railway stations in Great Britain closed in 2006